The Criterion Collection is a video distribution company which specializes in licensing and selling "important classic and contemporary films" in "editions that offer the highest technical quality and award-winning, original supplements." Janus Films and the Voyager Company established The Criterion Collection in 1984 as a privately held company concentrating exclusively upon the North American home video market. Aside from three early rare titles on VHS and Betamax cassette, between 1984 and 1998 Criterion published home video releases exclusively on the LaserDisc format, pioneering now standard features such as letterboxing, audio commentary tracks, and other supplemental content. In 1998, Criterion shifted from LaserDiscs into the then fledgling DVD market, and has since issued over 1,000 DVD and Blu-ray releases. In 2021, 4K Ultra HD releases were announced to launch starting with Citizen Kane in November. All of Criterion's LaserDisc releases have since gone out of print.

DVD, Blu-ray and 4K Ultra HD releases

 I Floating Weeds has been released on LaserDisc and the Essential Art House series, but A Story of Floating Weeds has not.
 II Akira Kurosawa's 1957 adaptation of The Lower Depths is included in the 25 Films by Akira Kurosawa box set, but Jean Renoir's 1936 adaptation is not.
 III Included as extra on The Seventh Seal Blu-ray and 2-DVD release. IV The By Brakhage: An Anthology, Volumes One and Two box set has only been released on Blu-ray.
 V The Pina Blu-ray release features both 2D and 3D versions.
 VI Included as extra on the Grey Gardens Blu-ray release.

Additional feature films
A related feature film (not a documentary related to the film's production or theme) is included as a bonus feature:
1Crook's Tour
 2 It's Impossible to Learn to Plow by Reading Books 
 3 Neapolitan Diary 
 4 Permanent Vacation 
 5 Berlin Alexanderplatz (1931) 
 6 The Lion Has Wings 
 7 Magnificent Obsession (1935) 
 8 Bucking Broadway 
 9 The Traveler 
 10 Cathy Come Home 
 11 Murder a la Mod 
 12 Killer's Kiss 
 13 Twelve Angry Men (1954) 
 14 Godzilla, King of the Monsters!
 15 Creative Nonfiction 
 16 The Report
 17 The Last Performance
 18 Broadway
 19 Kapurush
 20 The Underneath
 21 Stereo
 22 Homesdale
 23 On purge bébé
 24 The Front Page (1931)
 25 I Was Born, But...
 26 Filming Othello
 26 Downhill
 27
Holiday (1930)
 28
Spite Marriage
 29
Game of Death II
 30
Colorado Territory
 31
Shaft's Big Score!
 32
Calendar
 33
My Life as a Zucchini

April Fool's pranks
On April Fool's Day 2011, spine #573, which was not yet issued, was assigned to the 1984 movie C.H.U.D.
On April Fool's Day 2012, spine #620, which was not yet issued, was assigned to the 1990 movie Kindergarten Cop.

Essential Art House-only releases

 VII Floating Weeds was released by the Criterion Collection with A Story of Floating Weeds.

 VIII The Great Chase and The Love Goddessess were released by the Criterion Collection under the title Three Documentaries along with  Paul Robeson: Tribute to an Artist.

Merchant Ivory Collection
The Merchant Ivory Collection was released between 2003 and 2005 in DVD format. The entire Collection is currently out of print. The list is presented in order of release by Criterion.

Other releases

Boxed sets

LaserDiscs 

Criterion Collection released LaserDiscs from 1984 to 1998. These are now out of print.

VHS and Betamax cassettes 
In 1985 and 1989, Criterion Collection released three titles on VHS, Betamax and LaserDisc: The 39 Steps (1935), The Lady Vanishes (1938) and The Third Man (1949), with spine numbers 003–005 respectively. However, they did not sell well, and no more were issued, but they are now collectors' items.

See also
Masters of Cinema
FilmStruck
Z Channel – defunct movie channel, similar to Criterion
Shout! Factory – similar in content
Cinephilia
Kino Lorber – similarly focus on art house and classic films

References
General

Specific

External links
 – official site
Criterion Collection – release library (by spine#)
Criterion LaserDisc Collection at Criterion Collection via Archive.org (archive; no longer appears on site)

Criterion Collection
The Criterion Collection